Parthenopidae is a family of crabs, placed in its own superfamily, Parthenopoidea. It comprises nearly 40 genera, divided into two subfamilies, with three genera incertae sedis:

Daldorfiinae Ng & Rodríguez, 1986
Daldorfia Rathbun, 1904
Niobafia S. H. Tan & Ng, 2007
Olenorfia S. H. Tan & Ng, 2007
Thyrolambrus Rathbun, 1894

Parthenopinae MacLeay, 1838
† Acantholambrus Blow & Manning, 1996
Agolambrus S. H. Tan & Ng, 2007
Aulacolambrus Paul'son, 1875
† Bittnerilia De Angeli & Garassino, 2003
Celatopesia Chiong & Ng, 1998
Certolambrus S. H. Tan & Ng, 2003
Costalambrus S. H. Tan & Ng, 2007
Cryptopodia H. Milne-Edwards, 1834
Derilambrus S. H. Tan & Ng, 2007
Distolambrus S. H. Tan & Ng, 2007
Enoplolambrus A. Milne-Edwards, 1878
Furtipodia S. H. Tan & Ng, 2003
Garthambrus Ng, 1996
Heterocrypta Stimpson, 1871
Hispidolambrus McLay & S. H. Tan, 2009
Hypolambrus S. H. Tan & Ng, 2007
Lambrachaeus Alcock, 1895
Latulambrus S. H. Tan & Ng, 2007
Leiolambrus A. Milne-Edwards, 1878
Mesorhoea Stimpson, 1871
Mimilambrus Williams, 1979
Neikolambrus S. H. Tan & Ng, 2003
Nodolambrus S. H. Tan & Ng, 2007
Ochtholambrus S. H. Tan & Ng, 2007
Parthenope Weber, 1795
Parthenopoides Miers, 1879
Patulambrus S. H. Tan & Ng, 2007
Piloslambrus S. H. Tan & Ng, 2007
Platylambrus Stimpson, 1871
Pseudolambrus Paul’son, 1875
Rhinolambrus A. Milne-Edwards, 1878
Solenolambrus Stimpson, 1871
Spinolambrus S. H. Tan & Ng, 2007
Tutankhamen Rathbun, 1925
Velolambrus S. H. Tan & Ng, 2007
Zarenkolambrus McLay & S. H. Tan, 2009

incertae sedis
† Branchiolambrus Rathbun, 1908
Lambrus Leach, 1815
† Mesolambrus Müller & Collins, 1991

References

External links

Crabs
Decapod families